Giovanni Domenico Zucchinetti (1735- after 1801) was an Italian organist, brother to the composer Giovanni Bernardo Zucchinetti whom he succeeded in 1765 as organist at the cathedrals of Varese and Monza. His students included the famous contralto Giuseppina Grassini.

1735 births
Date of death unknown
Italian classical organists
Male classical organists